Border Guard Bangladesh Padak (Bravery) Bengali: {বর্ডার গার্ড বাংলাদেশ পদক (সেবা)}, is a border guard medal of Bangladesh. The medal is intended for the awarding the officers of Border Guard Bangladesh.

References 

Military awards and decorations of Bangladesh